Withlacoochee may refer to:

Wildwood, Lady Lake, Withlacoochee and Gulf Railway, incorporated under Florida state law chapter 3656, approved February 16, 1885
Withlacoochee, Plant City and Boca Grande Railroad, created with the approval of Florida state law chapter 4258, on May 31, 1893
Withlacoochee Railway, incorporated under Florida state law chapter 4256, approved May 24, 1893
Withlacoochee River (Suwannee River) originates in Georgia, northwest of Valdosta
Withlacoochee River (Florida) originates in central Florida's Green Swamp, east of Polk City
Withlacoochee State Forest, in the U.S. state of Florida
Withlacoochee State Trail, a 46-mile (74 km) long paved, multi-use, non-motorized rail trail in Florida